Euclastes is an extinct genus of sea turtles that survived the Cretaceous–Paleogene mass extinction. The genus was first named by Edward Drinker Cope in 1867, and contains three species. E. hutchisoni, was named in 2003 but has since been reassigned to the genus Pacifichelys, while E. coahuilaensis named in 2009 was reassigned as Mexichelys coahuilaensis in 2010.

Description 

Unlike the sea turtles Toxochelys and Eochelone, Euclastes has a secondary palate. However, the secondary palate of Euclastes is not as extensive as it is in Ctenochelys and Angolachelys. The genus can be distinguished by later sea turtles based on its broad, low skull; broad, flat palate; wide, flat dentary bone with an elongated symphysis; and low tomial ridge on the beak. The widened palate and dentaries give Eochelone wide, flat jaws suitable for crushing hard-shelled organisms.

Classification

Species 
 †E. acutirostris 
 †E. platyops 
 †E. wielandi

Phylogeny 
Cladogram based on Lynch and Parham (2003) and Parham and Pyenson (2010):

Distribution 
Fossils of Euclastes have been found in:

Maastrichtian
 Bentiaba, Angola
 Quiriquina Formation, Chile
 Hornerstown and Navesink Formations, New Jersey

Paleocene
 Jagüel and Roca Formations, Argentina
 Aquia and Brightseat Formations, Maryland
 Sidi Chennane and Couche 2 Formation, Morocco

Eocene
 Parkers Ferry Formation, South Carolina

References

External links 
 www.scistp.org

Chelonioidea
Prehistoric turtle genera
Cretaceous–Paleogene boundary
Maastrichtian genus first appearances
Eocene genus extinctions
Cretaceous turtles
Paleocene turtles
Eocene turtles
Late Cretaceous reptiles of Africa
Fossils of Angola
Late Cretaceous reptiles of North America
Cretaceous United States
Fossils of the United States
Late Cretaceous reptiles of South America
Cretaceous Chile
Fossils of Chile
Paleogene reptiles of Africa
Fossils of Morocco
Paleogene reptiles of North America
Paleogene United States
Paleogene reptiles of South America
Paleogene Argentina
Fossils of Argentina
Fossil taxa described in 1867
Taxa named by Edward Drinker Cope